Tuber borchii, known as the whitish truffle or bianchetto truffle, is a small, common species of edible truffle excellent for use in cuisine.

Taxonomy
Given its name by Carlo Vittadini from Latin borchii (from von der Borch, the naturalist who described the species in 1780).

Description
The exterior is slightly velvety and white at first, and when mature it has a smooth, reddish ochre surface with brown markings. It has a compact consistency and, when sectioned, the interior is whitish when young, light ochre or pinkish brown with age. A series of white, twisted and branched veins run through the interior. Young specimens give off a pleasant smell, but when mature they give off an unpleasant smell reminiscent of kitchen gas. The flavor is described by some as garlicky, by others as similar to hazelnuts.
Seen through a microscope, the spores have an ellipsoidal to rounded shape, measuring 35–55 × 25–40 microns, and are brown in colour. The ascii are rather rounded and contain 1 to 4 spores.

There are many similar species: Tuber asa (with spores shaped like lemons when immature), Tuber oligospermum and Tuber puberulum (which has rounder spores).

Distribution and habitat
Whitish truffles often grow in oak groves, and less frequently under conifers. Like most truffles, it bears fruit underground, although not very deep (occasionally, mature specimens reach the surface). It bears fruit from winter to early summer (from December to June), in coastal or low-lying areas (between 200 and 1,000 metres above sea level). It is highly adaptable to different environments: although it prefers calcareous sandy soils (typical of coastal areas) it also bears fruit in black truffle (Tuber melanosporum) habitat at higher altitudes. It grows well in soils with a pH of 7–8, as well as in subalkalines with a pH of 6–7, although occasionally it also grows in soils with a pH as low as 5.2. It is found throughout Europe: from Finland to Italy (Tuscany, Abruzzo, Romagna, Umbria, Marche, Molise and Sicily) and the Iberian Peninsula (Andalusia, Portugal, and Castile and León), and from Ireland and Great Britain to Hungary and Poland.

Use and cultivation
It is harvested from winter to spring (from mid-January to the end of April in Italy), unlike Tuber magnatum, which is collected in autumn and early winter. It sells for some 300–400 €/kg. Although it is not as sought after as Tuber magnatum or Tuber melanosporum, there are several reasons for its cultivation: it fruits early in new plantations (as early as 4 years in pine), is adaptable to different ecological niches, is not extremely specific to host plants, and lastly, it is very competitive with other ectomycorrhizal fungi (particularly in young plantations).

Mycorrhiza Biotech of Gibsonville, North Carolina has been developing methods for commercial production of bianchetto truffles in North Carolina. Their CEO, Nancy Rosborough, reports 2021 harvests from their plots are outstanding, producing as much as an estimated 200 pounds.

References

 Iotti, M., Lancellotti, E., Hall, I. i Zambonelli, A., 2010. The ectomycorrhizal community in natural Tuber borchii grounds. FEMS Microbiology Ecology, 72: 250–260. 
 Urbanelli, S., Sallicandro, P., De Vito, E., Bullini, L. i Biocca, E., 1998. Biochemical systematics of some species in the genus Tuber. Mycologia 90: 537–546.
 de Borch, Michel-Jean 1780. Lettres sur les truffes du Piémont (French)
 Vittadini, Carlo., Monographia Tuberacearum (Latin)

Truffles (fungi)